Mikaela Pauline Shiffrin (born March 13, 1995) is an American World Cup alpine skier who has the most World Cup wins of any alpine skier in history (men or women) and is considered the greatest alpine skier of all time. She is a two-time Olympic Gold Medalist. She is a five-time Overall World Cup champion, a four-time world champion in slalom and a seven-time winner of the World Cup discipline title in that event. Shiffrin is the youngest slalom champion in Olympic alpine skiing history, at 18 years and 345 days.

Shiffrin won her seventh career Alpine world championships gold medal on February 16, 2023, taking her overall tally to 14 medals from 16 career world championship races, and making Shiffrin the most successful skier in the modern era.

Background and early years
Born in Vail, Colorado, Shiffrin is the second child of Eileen (née Condron) and Jeff Shiffrin, both originally from the Northeastern United States and former ski racers. Her paternal grandfather was Jewish. Shiffrin's father Jeff grew up in New Jersey and was an avid skier on weekends in Vermont with his family. As an undergraduate, he raced for Dartmouth College in New Hampshire. Her mother Eileen raced in high school in northwestern Massachusetts in the Berkshires, and her brother Taylor (born 1992) raced for the University of Denver.

When Mikaela was eight in 2003, the family moved to rural New Hampshire near Lyme, where her father, an anesthesiologist, worked at Dartmouth–Hitchcock Medical Center. After five years, he took a new job in Denver; Shiffrin's older brother Taylor was in high school at Burke Mountain Academy, a ski academy in northeastern Vermont, and stayed in the east. Shiffrin also attended middle school at Burke but went with her parents to Colorado before returning to Burke.

From a young age, Mikaela had strong results in major competitions.  In March 2010, at age 14, she won both the slalom and GS at the Topolino Games in Italy, against skiers from 40 nations.  The following winter, now meeting the FIS minimum age requirement of 15 years, she won a Nor-Am Cup super combined race in December 2010 at Panorama in British Columbia, only the eighth FIS-level race in which she had competed. Shiffrin followed it up with three podiums in her next three Nor-Am races: runner-up in a super-G, third in a GS, and victory in a slalom. Weeks later, she won a pair of Nor-Am slalom races held at Sunday River, Maine. A month later, Shiffrin took the slalom bronze medal at the FIS Junior World Ski Championships held at Crans-Montana, Switzerland (after having been down with a stomach virus the day before). In January 2015, Shiffrin named Croatian former ski racer Janica Kostelić and American Bode Miller as her idols while growing up. Since 2021, she is in a relationship with fellow skier Aleksander Aamodt Kilde.

Ski racing career
Shiffrin made her World Cup debut on March 11, 2011, in giant slalom at Špindlerův Mlýn in the Czech Republic. In early April, just a few weeks after her 16th birthday, she won the slalom title at the US National Championships at Winter Park, Colorado, and became the youngest American ski racer to claim a national alpine crown.

2012 season

During the 2012 Alpine Skiing World Cup, Shiffrin, age 16, took her first World Cup podium on December 29, 2011, at a slalom in Lienz, Austria. She started 40th, lost her left shin guard halfway down, but finished in 12th place in the first run. Shiffrin then posted the fastest time in the second run to secure third place.

2013 season
Shiffrin won her first World Cup race in December 2012 at age 17, in a night slalom in Åre, Sweden. She became the second-youngest American to win an alpine World Cup event, behind Judy Nagel (17 yr, 5 mo.). Shiffrin's second win came two weeks later at a night slalom at Zagreb, Croatia, and her third win 11 days later at another night slalom in Flachau, Austria. After winning the slalom at the World Cup finals in Lenzerheide, she secured the 2013 season title in the slalom discipline. Though she spent most of her last two years of high school in Europe on the World Cup circuit, she graduated on time from Burke Mountain Academy in June.

2014 season
Shiffrin opened the 2014 season in October 2013 in Sölden, Austria, with a career-best sixth in giant slalom, within a half-second of the podium. She won the next event, a slalom at Levi, Finland, improving on her podium finish the previous year for her fifth World Cup victory. At Beaver Creek, she was runner-up in the giant slalom, her first World Cup podium in that discipline. On January 5, Shiffrin secured first place in a two-run slalom race in Bormio, Italy (the race took place there instead of in Zagreb, as scheduled, due to bad snow/weather conditions). She also won the world cup slalom races in Flachau, Åre, and Lenzerheide to secure a second consecutive World Cup slalom title. Shiffrin ended the season as the reigning Olympic, World Cup, and world champion in slalom. That year, she was named one of ESPNW's Impact 25.

2015 season
Shiffrin opened the 2015 season in October 2014 in Sölden with her first World Cup win in giant slalom. She had some trouble with slalom at first and ended up outside the podium in the first three World Cup slalom races, but emerged victorious in the races at Kühtai, Zagreb, Maribor, Åre and Méribel. She ended up winning the slalom world cup title once again. Shiffrin also won the World Championship in slalom held in Beaver Creek next to her home city of Vail, Colorado, USA.

2016 season
In the first two slalom races of the 2016 season, both in Aspen, Shiffrin won by large margins, and in her first race, she achieved a new record margin for women's slalom, 3.07 seconds over the runner-up. On December 12, 2015, during the warm-up for the giant slalom in Åre, she fell and injured her knee. After two months away from racing, Shiffrin made a successful return in her first race back on February 15, 2016, where she took her 18th victory in Crans-Montana. In the 2016 season, she won all five slaloms she started. She missed the other five slaloms due to injuries and chose not to compete in parallel slalom in Stockholm.

2017 season
Shiffrin opened the 2017 season with a second-place finish in giant slalom at Sölden in October 2016. This was followed by a victory in slalom at Levi on November 12.  On November 26, 2016, she finished fifth in giant slalom at Killington in her first World Cup race in Vermont, but she returned the following day to a first-place finish in the slalom. On December 11, 2016, Shiffrin won her 11th straight World Cup in the slalom in Sestriere, Italy. On December 27, Shiffrin won the giant slalom in Semmering, Austria, her second career giant slalom win and her first solo giant slalom win. The next day, she repeated and won her third career giant slalom and 25th World cup career victory. Shiffrin subsequently won the final race held at Semmering, a slalom, on December 29, 2016, achieving her 26th World cup victory and completing her sweep of races at the resort. This made her the first woman to take three wins in three consecutive days in technical disciplines since Vreni Schneider won two giant slaloms in Schwarzenberg and a slalom in Mellau in January 1989. However she missed out on equalling the record of eight consecutive slalom wins, jointly held by Schneider and Janica Kostelić when she failed to finish first run of the Snow Queen Trophy race in Zagreb on January 3 – her first DNF in slalom since a race in Semmering in 2012. On January 29 in Cortina d'Ampezzo, Italy, Shiffrin posted her best result in a speed event, finishing fourth in the super-G, only 0.03 seconds off the podium. She won her first parallel slalom on January 31 in Stockholm, Sweden.

At the World Championships in St. Moritz in February, she won the gold medal in slalom and took the silver in giant slalom. The gold was her third consecutive in slalom at the World Championships; she became the first woman to do this in the World Cup era and the first since Germany's Christl Cranz in 1939 when the Worlds were held annually.

On February 26, Shiffrin won her first super combined race at Crans-Montana.   In Squaw Valley, the first World Cup races there since 1969, she won the giant slalom on March 10 and the slalom the following day, taking her to 31 World Cup victories and 11 for the season. This secured her fourth slalom world cup. In Aspen, Colorado, the World Cup finals of the season took place. Shiffrin secured her first overall World Cup but did not win the giant slalom World Cup that year.  She finished the season with more World Cup victories before the age of 22 than Ingemar Stenmark, the record holder for number of World Cup victories.  After the season, she received the "Skieur d’Or" (golden skier) award, given by the international ski journalist association to the best alpine skier of the year (one award for both genders).

2018 season
Shiffrin started the 2018 season with a 5th-place finish in giant slalom at Sölden. In early December, she competed in downhill at Lake Louise, where she reached her first downhill podium (3rd place), and the next day she won her first downhill race in her fourth-ever start.

Between December 19 and January 9, Shiffrin won 8 of the 9 races on the World Cup circuit (4 SL, 2 GS, and 2 PSL). She made history by winning the very first FIS parallel slalom with the win in Courchevel, France. Then she won the slalom in Lienz, Austria, to finish her 2017 year. She started 2018 with a win in the City Event in Oslo, Norway, and became the first woman ever with 2 wins in City Event. Two days later, she won the slalom in Zagreb, Croatia. With wins in both the giant slalom and slalom at Kranjska Gora, Slovenia, Shiffrin clocked up her 39th, and 40th World Cup wins at age 22. She then won the slalom in Flachau, Austria to equal Annemarie Moser-Pröll's record of 41 World Cup wins before her 23rd birthday. She also became the first woman in history to win the first 5 World Cup races of a calendar year and the first one in 20 years (since Katja Seizinger) to win 5 straight World Cup races. After a third place in downhill, things stopped going her way. The rest of January had two 7th places and three races where she did not finish.

At the 2018 Winter Olympics, in Pyeongchang, South Korea – after several days of weather postponements, which caused the first three and final two races to be held on consecutive days, Shiffrin won gold in giant slalom as well as silver in super combined. In the giant slalom, she finished second after the first run behind Italian Manuela Moelgg but was able to secure the gold when Moelgg made mistakes on the second run. Due to weather delays, the slalom was contested the day after the giant slalom. Shiffrin entered the heavy favorite as the reigning Olympic champion, three-time consecutive world champion, reigning World Cup champion, and the world cup leader in the event. She finished the first run in fourth and was unable to improve her ranking after the second run, missing the podium after winning every single major slalom title she entered in her career beforehand. Although she had originally intended to run at least 4 races, she pulled out of the super-G due to its being held the day after slalom, believing that she would not be able to perform well if she did 3 races in as many days. The weather delays also caused the downhill and the super combined to be held on consecutive days, choosing to run only one of the two. Believing she had her best chance at a medal in super combined, she pulled out of the downhill after running all three training runs, her best finish being 5th in the 3rd and final training run. In the super combined, the final individual alpine event on the Olympic schedule, she finished 6th after the downhill. She was far behind the leader, 1.98 seconds behind her compatriot Lindsey Vonn. However, due to having the 3rd fastest slalom run—and many of the leaders of the first run having mistakes in the second—she was able to move up to the silver medal position behind Michelle Gisin of Switzerland. Her gold and silver medals coming out of the Olympics made her the most decorated American Olympian, the most decorated female alpine skier, and the second most decorated alpine skier overall, behind only Marcel Hirscher of Austria, who won two gold medals.

Shiffrin secured her second consecutive World Cup overall title on March 9, 2018, with 5 races left in the season. At the World Cup Finals in Åre, Sweden, she won the slalom by 1.58 seconds over Wendy Holdener of Switzerland, her 12th win of the season. This tied her for second with her teammate Lindsey Vonn for most World Cup wins in a single season by a woman, behind Swiss skier Vreni Schneider holding the record of 14.

2019 season
On December 2, 2018, she won a super-G race in Lake Louise, becoming the only alpine skier ever — male or female — to win all six currently contested alpine skiing disciplines. These include slalom, giant slalom, downhill, super-G, combined, and the most recently added, parallel slalom (also called a city event).
Tina Maze and Lindsey Vonn never won a parallel slalom race since its introduction into the World Cup competition. With her 1st super-G World Cup win at Lake Louise, Shiffrin became the seventh woman to win in the five more traditional disciplines (not including parallel slalom). She joined Lindsey Vonn, Tina Maze, Janica Kostelić, Anja Pärson, Pernilla Wiberg, and Petra Kronberger.

On December 8, 2018, she won her second Super-G at St. Moritz, Switzerland, for her first back-to-back speed wins. The next day, December 9, she won her 4th parallel slalom with a dramatic win over her main slalom rival, the Slovakian Petra Vlhová. This marked her 5th win out of 9 season races to start the 2018–2019 season. On December 22, 2018, she won the slalom in Courchevel, France, and became the youngest skier, female or male, to win 50 World Cup ski races at 23 years and nine months. With that race, she also equaled the record of the Austrian Marlies Schild for the most wins in women's slalom – 35, and put herself in joint seventh place in all-time World Cup victories with Alberto Tomba of Italy.

One week later, she took another World Cup slalom win in Semmering, Austria, becoming the first alpine skier to take 15 World Cup wins in a single calendar year, moving ahead of Marcel Hirscher, who had taken 14 wins in 2018: both had broken the old record of 13 wins which had been set by Ingemar Stenmark in 1979. The race was also her 36th World Cup slalom win, breaking Schild's record: Shiffrin subsequently described Schild as "my biggest idol beside Bode Miller".

At the start of February 2019, shortly before the 2019 Alpine World Ski Championships, Shiffrin moved into third place on the list of female skiers with the most World Cup race wins at a meeting in Maribor, tying with Vlhová for the win in giant slalom to put her equal with Vreni Schneider on 55 wins before winning a slalom the following day to overtake the Swiss skier.

At the World Championships, Shiffrin won the gold medal in the super-G before taking a bronze in the giant slalom in windy, changeable conditions, finishing behind Vlhová and Viktoria Rebensburg. She went on to secure a second gold in the slalom, becoming the first alpine skier to win four consecutive World Championships in the same discipline, despite suffering from a lung infection on the day of the race.

Following the Worlds, in March 2019, Shiffrin became the first alpine skier to take 15 World Cup wins in a season when she took victory in slalom in Špindlerův Mlýn, breaking the record she had previously held jointly with Vreni Schneider. At the World Cup finals in Soldeu, Shiffrin started her campaign by clinching the super-G crystal globe, finishing fourth in the final race to take her tenth World Cup title and her first in a speed discipline, having already built an unassailable lead to secure the overall and slalom titles earlier in the season. She became the first skier to win World Cups in a technical and a speed event in the same season since Tina Maze six years earlier. She went on to win the slalom, her 16th win of the season and the 40th slalom win of her career, tying with Stenmark for the most World Cup slalom race wins. The following day she took her 17th win of the season and the 60th win of her career in the giant slalom to secure the GS crystal globe, becoming the first skier to win the overall, super-G, giant slalom and slalom World Cup titles in a single season. She also later won her 41st slalom race, making her the skier who has won the most World Cup slalom races.

2020 season
Shiffrin had inconsistent performances in the technical races in the first half of the 2020 season, winning three slalom races to start but placing runner-up to Petra Vlhova later in the season. She also experienced similar fluctuations in ranking in Giant Slalom. However, she competed more frequently in speed races and, following the Bansko World Cup in January 2020, had recorded 6 victories for the season, 3 slaloms and one each in giant slalom, Super-G, and Downhill, off pace with her performance in previous seasons, but still the most on the World Cup tour and with a considerable lead in the Overall Standings. However, on February 2, 2020, her father unexpectedly died in an accident, causing her to take an indefinite break from the World Cup tour and her chances of a fourth consecutive title. She did attend the final competition in Åre, Sweden, but the race was canceled due to the coronavirus. As a result, Petra Vlhova took over the top spot of the slalom rankings following a World Cup in Slovenia, the first time Shiffrin wasn't leading slalom at that point in the season since 2016, and Federica Brignone reduced her lead overall from over 400 points to just over 100, and later took over the lead in the overall, which marked the end of Shiffrin's three-year winning streak.

2021 season
Shiffrin missed the first race weekend of the season in Sölden due to a back issue, but returned to racing in the first of the two slalom races at Levi, where she placed second. Shiffrin did not manage to return to the same level of domination that she left the World Cup circuit on, but nonetheless placed in the top six in every race, winning the Courchevel giant slalom in December and the Flachau night slalom in January, and placing third in the slalom at Semmering in late December.

However, at the 2021 World Championships in Cortina d'Ampezzo, Shiffrin emerged on top form, performing perhaps even better than expected and winning four medals, the most she has won in a single World Championship event. Her bronze medal run in the Super G was her first time competing in a speed event in over a year, as she had opted not to return to speed events this season due to her wanting to ensure that the return to racing would not be too heavy as well as the COVID-19 pandemic keeping her apart from the speed team and training. This feat was made more impressive by the fact that she had only trained Super-G for four days going into the competition. Her gold medal in the Alpine Combined made her the most successful American alpine skier in the World Championships – with her sixth gold and ninth medal she surpassed the record five WCH gold medals won by Ted Ligety, as well as the record of eight WCH medals in total held by Lindsey Vonn.

In the Giant Slalom, many of the favorites struggled, with World Cup leader Marta Bassino, two-time world champion Tessa Worley and reigning world champion Petra Vlhova struggling in both runs while the host country favorite Federica Brignone failed to finish the first run. Shiffrin ultimately won the silver in the Giant Slalom after narrowly finishing in first after one run, only .02 ahead of teammate Nina O’Brien and .08 ahead of Lara Gut-Behrami. Going into the second run with a narrow lead, a mistake at the top of the course caused her to miss out on the gold medal; although she made up lost time at the bottom of the course, it wasn't enough, finishing only .02 seconds behind Gut-Behrami. Austrian Katharina Liensberger moved up to third with only a .09 second deficit, making it the closest contested Giant Slalom in world championship history. Shiffrin entered the final race of the championships, the slalom, with a record four consecutive world championship titles to her name. However, she struggled in the first run, skiing into fourth with a 1.30-second deficit behind Liensberger, Vlhova, and Wendy Holdener. She was able to overtake Holdener in the second run but was beaten by Vlhova and Liensberger, winning the bronze and losing the slalom title for the first time in her career; however, her bronze medal win still gave her an 11th world championship medal, tied with Anja Parson for the most medals won since World War 2, the most medals won by an athlete at the 2021 championships and extending her record as the most decorated American alpine skier in world championship history.

2022 season
At the 2022 Winter Olympics, Shiffrin was favored to win gold in at least three of the six events she was planning to compete in (especially her signature slalom and giant slalom). However, she uncharacteristically had a Did Not Finish (DNF) in the giant slalom and slalom, skiing out after the fifth gate in the first run of each race. She finished ninth in the super-G. In the remaining individual events (downhill and combined), Shiffrin did not win a medal. She competed in the mixed team event for the first time on the last day of competition, finishing fourth as part of the U.S. team.

2023 season
In March 2023, Shiffrin won her 87th World Cup race, overtaking Ingemar Stenmark (86) for the most World Cup wins by any alpine skier. Days earlier, she had captured her 84th and 85th victories, placing her in second behind Stenmark (86) for the most World Cup wins by any alpine skier. In an interview on 27 February 2023, Stenmark hailed Shiffrin: "She’s much better than I was. You cannot compare...  I could never have been so good in all disciplines".

Statistics
By winning her second Olympic gold medal in the 2018 giant slalom, Shiffrin tied Ted Ligety and Andrea Mead Lawrence for the most Olympic gold medals ever won by an American Olympian in alpine skiing. She is one of only 5 Americans to ever win the World Cup overall title. In World Championships, she is the most decorated American alpine skier in history, having won the most medals (14) overall, a record seven of them gold. She is also the first and only athlete—male or female—with wins in all six FIS Alpine Ski World Cup disciplines. She has won World Cup races in ladies' slalom, parallel slalom, giant slalom, super-G, downhill, and alpine combined. She is the youngest skier—male or female—to win 50 World Cup races, doing so at the age of 23 years and 9 months.

She has won 87 World Cup races, overtaking Ingemar Stenmark for the most World Cup wins by any alpine skier, including 53 slalom races, the most won by any alpine skier in any discipline and 20 giant slalom races tied for most by any female alpine skier. Regardless of gender, Shiffrin is the only athlete to have won 15 races in the same calendar year, winning the last slalom of the 2018 season in Semmering and surpassing Marcel Hirscher. In the 2019 season, she became the first athlete, female or male, to win 17 World Cup races during a season, breaking the record of 14 wins that Vreni Schneider had held for 30 years. By winning the Gold in the Slalom at the 2019 World Championships, she became the first Alpine skier to win the world championship in the same discipline at four consecutive championships. At the Cortina 2021 World Championships, she became the first skier - male or female - to win gold medals at five straight Worlds. With her gold in giant slalom at Courchevel/Meribel 2023, she has now extended that record to six straight Worlds.

World Cup results

Season titles

15 titles – (5 overall, 7 Slalom, 1 Super-G, 2 Giant slalom)

Season standings

Race victories

Victories (88)

Including both parallel slalom and parallel giant slalom.

World Championship results
Shiffrin competed in her first World Championships in 2013 at Schladming, Austria, and finished sixth in the giant slalom at Planai. Two days later, in the slalom, she won the world title at age 17.

Olympic results
Favored to win the slalom at the 2014 Winter Olympics in Sochi, Russia, Shiffrin led after the first run and nearly fell in the second, but held on for victory at Rosa Khutor. Three weeks shy of her 19th birthday, she became the youngest slalom champion in Olympic history. Three days earlier, she finished fifth in the giant slalom, held in the rain.

She competed in the 2018 Winter Olympics in Pyeongchang, where she won the gold medal in the giant slalom and silver medal in the Combined. She placed 4th in the slalom despite being favored to win the gold medal in the event.

Media appearances and documentaries
Days after her first World Cup finals in 2013, Shiffrin was interviewed by David Letterman on the Late Show on March 19.

In 2014, Shiffrin was featured in a one-hour special on NBC television, How to Raise an Olympian, on February 5. Hosted by Meredith Vieira, it chronicled the journeys of seven US Olympians and featured interviews from parents and coaches along with home videos and photos from each athlete's childhood. The event was broadcast on television with live social-media components to enhance each segment. After Shiffrin's first gold medal win, she played "Catch Phrase" with Reese Witherspoon and Usher on The Tonight Show Starring Jimmy Fallon. On July 12, 2014, Shiffrin was a guest on the NPR radio show Wait Wait... Don't Tell Me!, where she won the show's Not My Job game at the Red Rocks Amphitheatre.

On October 27, 2016, Shiffrin, speaking in German, presented the award for the best Austrian sportsman to Marcel Hirscher at a sports gala in Austria. In 2017, Shiffrin discussed her skiing roots and aptitude for napping on NBC's Late Night with Seth Meyers. In 2018, Shiffrin was profiled on CBS News' 60 Minutes.

In the weeks after the February 2019 World Ski Championship, Amanda Ruggeri twice profiled Shiffrin in Deadspin, and she was featured in The Wall Street Journal. In March 2019, after the conclusion of her record-setting World Cup season, she discussed handling anxiety on NBC's Today, addressed dealing with social media trolls on CNN, discussed pay equity on ABC's Good Morning America and the entertainment news show Access, and taught host Jimmy Fallon how to do the shuffle dance on NBC's Tonight Show. The New York Times profiled Shiffrin as "the face of American skiing,", a theme echoed in a Sports Illustrated profile and video where Shiffrin talked in detail about her history with Lindsey Vonn.

Shiffrin has been the subject of long-form documentary videos. She is often featured in Outside's "In Search of Speed," including in 2015, 2017 and 2018. After covering Shiffrin's training regimen in 2017, Red Bull in 2018 produced the 48-minutes long documentary "Peak Season: The Determination of Mikaela Shiffrin." In April 2019, NBC's Olympic channel devoted 25 hours of prime-time to feature 20 of Shiffrin's races in the 2018–2019 season; her fanclub also released a compilation of highlights from her 2018–2019 season.

In October 2022, she was interviewed on Boomer Esiason's podcast.  During the interview, reference was made to a piece written by Shiffrin about her father's passing in "The Players' Tribune".

In December 2022, Shiffrin began releasing documentary videos on her own Youtube channel, with themes and content of her choosing.

References

External links

Mikaela Shiffrin Biography, info also
"Bill Green visits with Olympic hopeful Mikaela Shiffrin", WCSH6.com, June 9, 2013.

1995 births
Alpine skiers at the 2014 Winter Olympics
Alpine skiers at the 2018 Winter Olympics
Alpine skiers at the 2022 Winter Olympics
American female alpine skiers
FIS Alpine Ski World Cup champions
Living people
Medalists at the 2014 Winter Olympics
Medalists at the 2018 Winter Olympics
Olympic gold medalists for the United States in alpine skiing
Olympic silver medalists for the United States in alpine skiing
People from Vail, Colorado
Sportspeople from Colorado
People from Lyme, New Hampshire
21st-century American women
American sportswomen